Krishnagudiyil Oru Pranayakalathu is a 1997 Indian Malayalam-language romance film written and directed by Kamal, starring Jayaram, Manju Warrier, Balachandra Menon, Biju Menon and Vinaya Prasad. The music was composed by Vidyasagar.

Plot
Meenakshi, after her father's death, joins her sister, Uma and brother in law, Pavithran at Krishnagudi, a small fictional village in Andhra Pradesh as Pavithran and Uma are Army officers posted there. The jovial and amiable atmosphere brings cheer and happiness back to Meenakshi.

Giri, a family friend of Pavi, falls in love with Meenakshi, but she is not ready to accept his feelings. Akhilachandran, Meenakshi's spoiled cousin, was supported by her father after the death of his parents. Her father always wanted her to marry Akhil, but his extra-possessive attitude and violent behavior had created problems for her. Though she never had any soft feelings for him, Meenakshi had promised her father on his deathbed that she would marry Akhil.

Pavi and Uma now want Meenakshi to marry Giri, who is a soft-spoken and fun-loving guy. Akhil goes missing for a long time. Pavi suggests that Meenakshi should wait six months. If Akhil doesn't turn up in that time, then Meenakshi should accept Giri. She agrees. She mails Akhil about this, but no reply comes back. Giri and Meenakshi become close.

Suddenly one evening, a man named Renji turns up at the quarter of Giri. Renji, a close friend of Akhil, informs Giri that Akhil had had an accident on his way back to Krishnagudi and is partially paralyzed. He was under Renji's care, but Renji has to leave for the U.S. So, Akhil should be handed over to Meenakshi. Giri breaks down after hearing the news that Akhil is returning.

Giri and Jose, his roommate, take Akhil to a vacant quarter nearby and decide to take care of him, without letting Meenakshi or Pavi know. Akhil, a completely changed man, does not want to be a burden to Meenakshi and wants her to marry Giri as she had planned. After a few days, Giri is unable to take it anymore and reveals the truth to Meenakshi and Pavi.

When she learns this, Meenakshi believes it is her moral responsibility to take care of the paralyzed Akhil and she decides to leave Krishnagudi for Kerala with him. Pavi and Uma go along to drop them off in Kerala. At the last moment, from the train, Akhil, using all his power, pushes Meenakshi out, asking her to join Giri for the rest of her life.

Cast

Jayaram as Giri Menon, a railway employee. Love interest of Meenakshi
Manju Warrier as Meenakshi, Sister of Pavi, fiancée of Akhilachandran, Love interest of Giri
Biju Menon as Akhilachandran, Family friend of Pavi and Meenakshi, Fiancée of Meenakshi.
Balachandra Menon as  Pavithran, brother of Meenakshi 
Vinaya Prasad as Uma, wife of Pavi and sister-in-law of Meenakshi 
Siddique as Renji, friend of Akhilachandran
Jagadish as George Abraham, colleague, roommate and best friend of Giri
Narendra Prasad as Krishnankutty, Meenakshi's father 
Augustine as Gangadharan, an alcoholic colleague of Giri and Jose 
Vineeth Kumar as Balan 
Sukumari as Giri's mother 
Kavya Madhavan as Anjali (Giri's sister)
Srividya as Mrs. Nair
Vijayan Peringodu as Ayyappan, Giri's Uncle

Soundtrack 

All the songs were composed by Vidyasagar and all the lyrics are penned by Girish Puthenchery. The latter received the Kerala State film award for best lyricist  award for the song Pinneyum Pinneyum Aaro Kinavinte.

Awards

References

External links
 

1990s Malayalam-language films
1997 romantic drama films
Indian romantic drama films
1997 films
Films directed by Kamal (director)
Films scored by Vidyasagar
Films with screenplays by Ranjith